The 120 members of the sixth Knesset were elected on 1 November 1965. The breakdown by party was as follows:
Alignment: 45
Gahal: 26
National Religious Party: 11
Rafi: 10
Mapam: 8
Independent Liberals: 5
Agudat Yisrael: 4
Rakah: 3
Progress and Development: 2
Poalei Agudat Yisrael: 2
Cooperation and Brotherhood: 2
HaOlam HaZeh – Koah Hadash: 1
Maki: 1

List of members

Replacements

External links
Members of the Sixth Knesset Knesset website

 
06